The BMW E23 is the first generation of the BMW 7 Series luxury cars and was produced from 1977 until 1986. It was built in a 4-door sedan body style with 6-cylinder engines, to replace the BMW 'New Six' (E3) sedans. From 1983 until 1986, a turbocharged 6-cylinder engine was available.

In 1986, the E23 was replaced by the E32 7 Series, however, the E23 models (called L7) remained on sale in the United States until 1987.

The E23 introduced many electronic features for the first time in a BMW, including an on-board computer, service interval indicator, a "check control panel" (warning lights to indicate system faults to the driver), a dictaphone and complex climate control systems. It was also the first BMW to offer an anti-lock braking system (ABS), a driver's airbag (optional, starting in April 1985) and a new design of front suspension.

Development and production 
The initial styling concepts were developed under BMW Design Director Paul Bracq, with Manfred Rennen contributing with the exterior styling.

Production occurred from 1977 until 1986, during which time 285,029 cars were built.

Engines 
All models were powered by a straight-six petrol engine, with the majority of cars using the BMW M30 engine. Most engines were fuel-injected, however the 728 and 730 models of 1978–1979 used a Solex four-barrel carburetor. The fuel-injected models initially used the Bosch L-Jectronic system, until the 1979 732i, which was the first BMW to use the Bosch Motronic fuel-injection system.

Transmissions 
The available transmissions consisted of:
 4-speed manual
 5-speed manual
 3-speed automatic
 4-speed automatic

Equipment 
Options included leather upholstery, wood trim, power seats, seat heaters, reclining rear seats, power windows, power mirrors, an in-car cellular telephone and rear-armrest radio controls (only with the executive and highline pack ).

Yearly changes

1983 facelift 

The 1983 model year facelift (produced from September 1982) included styling changes to the front of the car: wider and more angular 'kidney' grilles, valance/spoiler, bumper bars, etc. Inside the car, the dashboard and instrument panels were also updated. The rear suspension was updated and the 735i engine changed from the M90 to the M30B34.

1984 
In the US, 1984 saw the arrival of the optional 4-speed automatic transmission (replacing the 3-speed unit previously offered), wood trim replacing the plastic above the glove compartment and on the ashtray and electrically adjustable power seats. Michelin TRX tyres (requiring special metric wheels) became available as an option on the 5-speed manual models.

Special models

725i 
The 725i model was not officially sold, it was produced for West German government agencies, which at the time, were not allowed to have engines larger than 2.5 liter on official cars. 921 models were produced.

Turbocharged 745i

The 745i was a high-performance model sold in left-hand-drive European markets from 1979–1986. It was initially powered by the M102 engine, which is a turbocharged 3.2 L version of the M30 straight-six engine, producing  at 9 PSI of boost. In 1982, the engine was upgraded to the M106, which increased the capacity to 3.4 litres and the fuel injection system changed from Jetronic to Motronic. Boost pressure was reduced to 6 PSI, however power output was unchanged.

All M102 cars were built with a 3-speed ZF 3HP22 automatic transmission. All M106 cars were built with a 4-speed ZF 4HP22 automatic transmission. Options included heated front and rear power reclining seats, gasoline fired heater, leather covered cellular telephone, rear-armrest radio control, water buffalo hide upholstery, and burl wood trim. 

The name 745i comes from the theoretical assumption that turbocharged engines have approximately 1.4 times more power than naturally aspirated engines. By this assumption, a 3.2 litre (3205 cc) turbocharged engine would have similar power to a 4.5 litre (4487 cc) naturally aspirated engine.

South African 745i
The South African 745i model was powered by the naturally aspirated M88/3 engine, instead of the turbocharged  M102/M106 engines of the European 745i. A right-hand-drive version of the turbocharged model was not possible due to the turbocharger being located in the right-hand side of the engine bay. Instead, the 745i was fitted with the  M88/3 engine, as used in the E24 M635i and E28 M5. The engine uses a 24-valve DOHC valvetrain and the fuel injection system is Bosch ML-Jetronic. 

A production run of 209 South African 745i was built from 1983 to 1987, 192 of which were with an automatic gearbox and 17 with a 5-speed manual gearbox.

BMW South Africa entered one of these 745i models in Class A of the South African Modified Saloon Car Championship The 745i won the championship in 1985, the only BMW-Sanctioned motorsport application in the history of BMW 7 Series cars.

United States and Japanese market models 

Only the 733i, 735i, and L7 models were sold in the United States and Japan. These markets also received only upscale versions, usually including leather upholstery, cruise control, wood trim, power windows, power sunroof, and other options as standard. 

North American versions were fitted with larger bumpers (to comply with the U.S. National Highway Traffic Safety Administration (NHTSA) standards), smaller sealed beam headlights, and various forms of emissions equipment that were not found on European-market cars. The engines used in these markets had lower-compression pistons and thus were less powerful than European-market versions. Some features such as ABS were available in markets outside North America before they were fitted on American models.

The L7 was a more luxurious version of the 735i for the American market only. It featured special leather upholstery with leather dashboard and door padding (rather than wood trim), a power glass Moonroof, and a variety of optional features as standard.  All L7 models were built with automatic transmissions and a standard driver's air bag.

References

Footnotes 

E23
7 Series (E23)
Cars introduced in 1977
Full-size vehicles
Luxury vehicles
Rear-wheel-drive vehicles
Sedans
1980s cars